Party Animals is a British television drama series screened on BBC Two in 2007. It was produced by World Productions, the makers of No Angels and This Life.

Party Animals tells the story of people working in and around the British Parliament, including researchers, lobbyists and Members of Parliament. The show featured Matt Smith in his first major television role, portraying Labour Party researcher Danny Foster. Andrew Buchan played Scott Foster, Danny's older brother and a lobbyist. The show also starred Shelley Conn as a Tory party parliamentary researcher and aspiring Minister, and Andrea Riseborough, who works alongside Danny as an intern.

In Australia, ABC1 began broadcasting the show from 2 December 2008 on a Tuesday 8:30pm timeslot over the ('non-ratings period') summer break. In the province of Ontario, Canada, TVOntario (Ontario's public educational media organisation), began showing the series in February 2010. In the province of British Columbia, Canada, The Knowledge Network began showing the series in September 2011. In Norway, NRK broadcast the show from May to June 2012. It is currently streaming on Hulu.

Cast
Andrew Buchan as Scott Foster
Shelley Conn as Ashika Chandrimani
Andrea Riseborough as Kirsty MacKenzie
Matt Smith as Danny Foster
Patrick Baladi as James Northcote
Clemency Burton-Hill as Sophie Montgomery
Pip Carter as Matt Baker
Raquel Cassidy as Jo Porter
Colin Salmon as Stephen Templeton
Peter Wight as George Morgan
Kika Markham as Vanessa Renfew
Marian McLoughlin as Barbara Foster
Emily Beecham as Vienna Lurie
Guy Flanagan as Felix Carrera
Nick Sampson as Paul Gaughan

References

External links
 
Official BBC website for Party Animals
Press pack for Party Animals
 
 TV producer Eleanor Greene talks about casting Matt Smith

2007 British television series debuts
2007 British television series endings
2000s British drama television series
BBC television dramas
British political drama television series
2007 in British politics
2000s British political television series